Group A of UEFA Euro 2000 began on 12 June and ended on 20 June 2000. Portugal won the group ahead of Romania, while England and Germany were surprisingly eliminated.

Teams

Notes

Standings

In the quarter-finals,
The winner of Group A, Portugal, advanced to play the runner-up of Group B, Turkey.
The runner-up of Group A, Romania, advanced to play the winner of Group B, Italy.

Matches

Germany vs Romania

Portugal vs England

Romania vs Portugal

England vs Germany

England vs Romania

Portugal vs Germany

References

External links
UEFA Euro 2000 Group A

Group A
Group
Group
Group
Group
England–Germany football rivalry